Tlumach, also referred to as Tovmach is a small city located in Ivano-Frankivsk Raion of Ivano-Frankivsk Oblast, in western Ukraine. It hosts the administration of Tlumach urban hromada, one of the hromadas of Ukraine. Population: . In 2001, population was around 8,800.

History

From the first partition of Poland in 1772 until 1918, the town (named Tłumacz) was part of the Austrian monarchy (Austria side after the compromise of 1867), head of the district with the same name, one of the 78 Bezirkshauptmannschaften in Austrian Galicia province (Crown land) in 1900.
After the collapse of Austria-Hungary the town briefly became part of  the Western Ukrainian Republic before returning to Poland when Poland repulsed the invading Red Army. The Peace of Riga in 1921, confirmed the Polish possession of Galicia.

A post-office was opened in 1858.

Tłumacz was the seat of a Powiat (district) in the Second Polish Republic. In 1921, its population was around 5,000, consisting 3319 Poles and 1395 Jews, 999 Ukrauinians. The Ukrainians dominated in the villages around the town.

During World War II, the Germans, with the assistance of local Ukrainians, murdered the Jews,.  Only about 30 Jews survived.  Poles who survived the war were forced by the Soviets to leave Tlumacz after 1945. Most of them settled in Lower Silesia; they organized themselves into the Association of Inhabitants of Tlumacz, which is located in Wrocław.

Until 18 July 2020, Tlumach was the administrative center of Tlumach Raion. The raion was abolished in July 2020 as part of the administrative reform of Ukraine, which reduced the number of raions of Ivano-Frankivsk Oblast to six. The area of Tlumach Raion was merged into Ivano-Frankivsk Raion.

Name
In Polish and Ukrainian the word means interpreter of the one who explains the meaning of words. Possibly it was named by the White Croats that once inhibited the area.

Local orientation

Regional orientation

People from Tlumach 
 Stanislaw Bober – Polish photographer and painter,
 Maria Dawska – Polish painter,
 Ostap Ortwin – Polish journalist and literary critic,
 Jozef Woroszczak – Polish politician.

References

External links
 Jewish references for Tlumach in JewishGen

Cities in Ivano-Frankivsk Oblast
Stanisławów Voivodeship
Shtetls
Cities of district significance in Ukraine
Holocaust locations in Ukraine